The 2009 Košice Open was a professional tennis tournament played on outdoor red clay courts. It was part of the 2009 ATP Challenger Tour. It took place in Košice, Slovakia between 8 and 14 June 2009.

Singles entrants

Seeds

 Rankings are as of May 25, 2009.

Other entrants
The following players received wildcards into the singles main draw:
  Jerzy Janowicz
  Martin Kližan
  Miloslav Mečíř Jr.
  Nicolas Reissig

The following players received entry a special Exempt into the singles main draw:
  Jan Hájek

The following players received entry from the qualifying draw:
  Diego Álvarez
  Kamil Čapkovič
  Ádám Kellner
  Marek Semjan (as a Lucky loser)
  Ivan Sergeyev

Champions

Singles

 Stéphane Robert def.  Jiří Vaněk, 7–6(5), 7–6(5)

Doubles

 Rubén Ramírez Hidalgo /  Santiago Ventura def.  Dominik Hrbatý /  Martin Kližan, 6–2, 7–6(5)

References
Official website
ITF search 

Kosice Open
Kos
Košice Open